Experimental Musical Instruments was a periodical edited and published by Bart Hopkin, an instrument builder and writer about 20th century experimental music design and custom made instrument construction. Though no longer in print, back issues are still available. The material and approach of EMI can now be found electronically on their site hosted by Bart Hopkin. This site is, together with www.oddmusic.com the main source on the internet for experimental musical instrumentalism.

Although only old editions of the magazine are still available and no newer editions appear, the name is still in use as the publisher for many of the book written by Bart Hopkin and co-writers.

Publications
Experimental Musical Instruments, magazine, 70 issues appeared as a printed publication between 1985 and 1999, later on re-issued as well on CD-ROM. It was first headquartered in Nicasio, California, and then in Point Reyes Station, California.

Books
Slap Tubes and other plosive Aerophones - Bart Hopkin and Phil Dadson, Experimental Musical Instruments
Getting a Bigger Sound - Bart Hopkin with Robert Cain and Jason Lollar
Making Marimbas and Other Bar Percussion Instruments - Bart Hopkin and Carl Dean with Christopher Banta
Wind Chimes, Design and Construction, Experimental Musical Instruments
Funny Noises for the Connoisseur, Book and audio CD - Bart Hopkin with Ray Brunelle and Vincent Nicastro
Air Columns and Tone Holes: Principles for Wind, Experimental Musical Instruments
Nice Noise - Bart Hopkin and Yuri Landman, 72 pgs, Full Color, 2012, Experimental Musical Instruments,

CDs
 INSTUMENTARIUM HOPKINIS, Bart Hopkin Plays Invented Instruments, 2002
21 WAYS OF LOOKING AT THINGS, Sound Instruments Designed by Bart Hopkin, 2007

References

External links
 Experimental Musical Instruments website
 Experimental Musical Instruments on Internet Archive

Experimental musical instruments
Music magazines published in the United States
Defunct magazines published in the United States
Magazines established in 1985
Magazines disestablished in 1999
1985 establishments in California
1999 disestablishments in California
Magazines published in California